Luka Bogdanović (born February 11, 1985) is a Serbian former professional basketball player who last played for Joventut Badalona of the Liga ACB.

Professional career
Bogdanović started playing basketball in Sports Center "25th May". Later, he played for a few Belgrade-based clubs like Beovuk 72, BKK Radnički and Crvena zvezda. Under head coach Zmago Sagadin he saw playing time in the senior team of Crvena zvezda. In the season 2003–04 he won the Radivoj Korać Cup.

In July 2004, he moved to the arch-rivals Partizan. Over three years in Partizan, he won three Basketball League of Serbia championships and also appeared in 48 games of the Euroleague. With coming of Vladimir Micov, he lost his role  in the team and saw little playing time, which eventually led to departure in 2007.

In the summer of 2007, he signed a contract with the French club Le Mans. In the 2007–08 Euroleague season, he had career-high 11.1 points and 1.2 assists per game. However, after just one season with Le Mans, he moved to DKV Joventut where he stayed for two seasons. In September 2010, he returned to France, signing contract with Chorale Roanne.

In December 2010, he signed a contract with the German club EWE Oldenburg for the rest of the season.

In June 2011, Bogdanović signed a two-year deal with Cajasol Sevilla. In July 2013, he signed a one-year contract with the Turkish club Türk Telekom.

In October 2014, Bogdanović returned to his former club Partizan. He signed an open contract with Serbian champion. In January 2015, he left Partizan and signed with BC Andorra of the Liga ACB for the rest of the season. On July 30, 2015, he re-signed with Andorra for one more season.

On August 3, 2016, Bogdanović returned to Joventut, signing a contract for the 2016–17 season.

International career
As a member of the FR Yugoslavia under-16 national team, he won a gold medal at the 2001 EuroBasket. He was also part of the Serbia and Montenegro under-20 national team that won the bronze medal at the 2005 EuroBasket.

Career statistics

Euroleague

|-
| style="text-align:left;"| 2004–05
| style="text-align:left;"| Partizan
| 14 || 7 || 20.8 || .422 || .357 || .810 || 3.5 || .7 || .6 || .1 || 7.7 || 6.0
|-
| style="text-align:left;"| 2005–06
| style="text-align:left;"| Partizan
| 14 || 7 || 20.8 || .373 || .391 || .800 || 3.7 || .9 || .7 || .2 || 6.9 || 6.4
|-
| style="text-align:left;"| 2006–07
| style="text-align:left;"| Partizan
| 20 || 1 || 14.8 || .444 || .475 || .867 || 3.1 || .9 || .5 || .0 || 5.8 || 6.7
|-
| style="text-align:left;"| 2007–08
| style="text-align:left;"| Le Mans
| 14 || 8 || 27.5 || .424 || .433 || .789 || 2.8 || 1.2 || .3 || .1 || 11.1 || 9.2
|-
| style="text-align:left;"| 2008–09
| style="text-align:left;"| Joventut
| 9 || 4 || 20.9 || .486 || .395 || 1.000 || 3.1 || .7 || .8 || .1 || 10.0 || 8.3
|- class="sortbottom"
| style="text-align:left;"| Career
| style="text-align:left;"|
| 71 || 27 || 20.4 || .428 || .412 || .828 || 3.2 || .9 || .5 || .1 || 8.0 || 7.2

Personal life
In June 2015, Bogdanović married fashion blogger Ana Ristić who's a cousin of Novak Djokovic's wife Jelena Ristić.

References

External links

 Luka Bogdanović at aba-liga.com
 Luka Bogdanović at acb.com
 Luka Bogdanović at euroleague.net
 Luka Bogdanović at eurobasket.com
 Luka Bogdanović at fiba.com

1985 births
Living people
ABA League players
Basketball League of Serbia players
BC Andorra players
Real Betis Baloncesto players
EWE Baskets Oldenburg players
Joventut Badalona players
KK Crvena zvezda players
KK Partizan players
Le Mans Sarthe Basket players
Liga ACB players
Serbian expatriate basketball people in Andorra
Serbian expatriate basketball people in France
Serbian expatriate basketball people in Germany
Serbian expatriate basketball people in Spain
Serbian expatriate basketball people in Turkey
Serbian men's basketball players
Small forwards
Basketball players from Belgrade
Türk Telekom B.K. players